The Short Oxford History of the Modern World series is a book series published by the Oxford University Press publishing house.

Each book gives a comprehensive introduction to a particular period or theme in history.

The general editor for the series is J.M. Roberts.

List of Books in the Series

Oxford University Press books
Series of history books